The felicific calculus is an algorithm formulated by utilitarian philosopher Jeremy Bentham (1747–1832) for calculating the degree or amount of pleasure that a specific action is likely to induce. Bentham, an ethical hedonist, believed the moral rightness or wrongness of an action to be a function of the amount of pleasure or pain that it produced.  The felicific calculus could, in principle at least, determine the moral status of any considered act.  The algorithm is also known as the utility calculus, the hedonistic calculus and the hedonic calculus.

To be included in this calculation are several variables (or vectors), which Bentham called "circumstances". These are:
 Intensity: How strong is the pleasure?
 Duration: How long will the pleasure last (its magnitude is composed)? 
 Certainty or uncertainty: How likely or unlikely is it that the pleasure will occur (its probability)?
 Propinquity or remoteness: How soon will the pleasure occur (measured by its opposite)? 
 Fecundity: The probability that the action will be followed by sensations of the same kind (is measured from a pain). 
 Purity: The probability that it will not be followed by sensations of the opposite kind (from a pleasure). 
 Extent: How many people will be affected (for example the number of people)?

Bentham's instructions
To take an exact account of the general tendency of any act, by which the interests of a community are affected, proceed as follows. Begin with any one person of those whose interests seem most immediately to be affected by it: and take an account,
 Of the value of each distinguishable pleasure which appears to be produced by it in the first instance.
 Of the value of each pain which appears to be produced by it in the first instance.
 Of the value of each pleasure which appears to be produced by it after the first. This constitutes the fecundity of the first pleasure and the impurity of the first pain.
 Of the value of each pain which appears to be produced by it after the first. This constitutes the fecundity of the first pain, and the impurity of the first pleasure.
 Sum up all the values of all the pleasures on the one side, and those of all the pains on the other. The balance, if it be on the side of pleasure, will give the good tendency of the act upon the whole, with respect to the interests of that individual person; if on the side of pain, the bad tendency of it upon the whole.
 Take an account of the number of persons whose interests appear to be concerned; and repeat the above process with respect to each. Sum up the numbers expressive of the degrees of good tendency, which the act has, with respect to each individual, in regard to whom the tendency of it is good upon the whole. Do this again with respect to each individual, in regard to whom the tendency of it is bad upon the whole. Take the balance which if on the side of pleasure, will give the general good tendency of the act, with respect to the total number or community of individuals concerned; if on the side of pain, the general evil tendency, with respect to the same community.

To make his proposal easier to remember, Bentham devised what he called a "mnemonic doggerel" (also referred to as "memoriter verses"), which synthesized "the whole fabric of morals and legislation":

Intense, long, certain, speedy, fruitful, pure—
Such marks in pleasures and in pains endure.
Such pleasures seek if private be thy end:
If it be public, wide let them extend
Such pains avoid, whichever be thy view:
If pains must come, let them extend to few.

Note
Based on the first volume of his complete works there are four deriving classifications or distinct objects of civil law   that is known as known in his penal laws: of Security, Subsistence, Abundance, Equality. 
There are also four sanctions that he defined, they are: Physical, Political, Moral (this is as a result social or legal and can lead to popular sanction), and Religious.  

 
“Sanctions. Since the Traites, others have been discovered. There are now, I. Human: six, viz. 1. Physical; 2. Retributive; 3. Sympathetic; 4. Antipathetic; 5. Popular, or Moral; 6. Political, including Legal and Administrative.

“II. Superhuman vice Religious: all exemplifiable in the case of drunkenness; viz. the punitory class.

“Note—Sanctions in genere duæ, punitoriæ et remuneratoriæ; in serie, septem ut super; seven multiplied by two, equal fourteen.

“The Judicatory of the popular or moral sanction has two Sections: that of the few, and that of the many: Aristocratical and Democratical: their laws, their decisions, are to a vast extent opposite.” 
Further, he bases a pleasure or a pain, or of benefit and mischief, that is in the method applied by knowing more of it from those seven above-mentioned references that are after to apply it to a respective purpose, else it is blindfolded. 
 Property and law are born and must die together. Before the laws, there was no property: take away the laws, and all property ceases. 
 
For bringing to view in a concise form these elements, seven in number, the following memoriter verses, awkward as verses of that class naturally are, may for the present serve:—

Intense, long, sure, not distant, fruitful, pure,

Such marks in pleasures and in pains endure.

Such pleasures seek, if private be thy end;

If it be public, wide let them extend.

Such pains avoid, whichever be thy view;

If pains must come, let them extend to few.  

Also look at his definition of "Posology"; it is derived on semantic branch of his taxonomy.

Hedons and dolors

The units of measurements used in the felicific calculus may be termed hedons and dolors.

See also
 Act utilitarianism
Bellman equation
 Ethical calculus
Reinforcement learning
 Science of morality
Utilitarian social choice rule - a mathematical formula for felicific calculus.

References

Utilitarianism
Hedonism
Pleasure